Ivan Hucko (born 3 January 1965) is a Slovak football manager. His father, Ján Hucko, was also a noted football coach.

References

Slovak football managers
1965 births
Living people
MFK Ružomberok managers
FC Spartak Trnava managers
Sportspeople from Bratislava